The Pentatomomorpha comprise an infraorder of insects in the true bug order Hemiptera. It unites such animals as the  stink bugs (Pentatomidae), flat bugs (Aradidae), seed bugs (Lygaeidae and Rhyparochromidae), etc. They are closely related to the Cimicomorpha.

Based on the fossil morphology, the common ancestor of Pentatomomorpha must be older than the fossils in the late Triassic. They play an important role in agriculture and forestry industries and they are also used as controlling agents in studies.

Systematics
Five superfamilies are usually placed in the Pentatomomorpha. The Aradoidea represent the most basal extant lineage, while the others, often united as clade Trichophora, are more modern:
 Aradoidea Brullé, 1836
 Coreoidea Leach, 1815
 Lygaeoidea Schilling, 1829
 Pentatomoidea Leach, 1815
 Pyrrhocoroidea Amyot & Serville, 1843

Among these, the Pentatomoidea seem to represent a by and large monophyletic lineage as traditionally understood, while the other three form a close-knit group and are in serious need of redelimitation. The Idiostolidae are usually considered a family of the Lygaeoidea, but in the past have been placed in a distinct monotypic superfamily Idiostoloidea, for example.

The Piesmatidae, usually placed in the Lygaeoidea also, are sometimes considered incertae sedis, or placed in a monotypic superfamily Piesmatoidea with the discovery of Cretopiesma. However a cladistic analysis rejected Cretopiesma from Piesmatidae and placed the genus in the family Aradidae.

References

External links

 
Heteroptera